Two referendums were held in San Marino on 20 October 2013. Voters were asked whether they approved of measures to tie salary increase to inflation and whether the country should submit an application to join the European Union. Although both proposals had a majority vote in favour, neither reached the quorum of 32% of registered voters in favour (10,657 voters), resulting in both proposals being rejected.

Background
The referendum question on salaries was organised by the Democratic Confederation of San Marino Workers, and proposed that salaries would be revalued on 1 January at the same rate as the Government's official inflation figure.

Results

See also
San Marino–European Union relations

References

Referendum
Referendums in San Marino
San Marino
Referendums related to European Union accession
San Marino